Margrave War is a term applied to several conflicts within the Holy Roman Empire:

First Margrave War (1308–1317)
Second Margrave War (1552–1555)